The 2015 Big Ten Conference men's soccer season was the 25th season of men's varsity soccer in the conference. Maryland entered the season as both the regular season champion and the Big Ten tournament champion.

Preseason 
Defending regular season and tournament champions Maryland were selected as the favorite ahead of the 2015 season.

Preseason poll

Teams

Stadia and locations 

 Illinois, Iowa, Minnesota, Nebraska and Purdue do not sponsor men's soccer

Personnel

Regular season

Results

Rankings

Postseason

Big Ten tournament

NCAA tournament

Statistics

See also 

 Big Ten Conference
 2015 Big Ten Conference Men's Soccer Tournament
 2015 NCAA Division I men's soccer season
 2015 in American soccer

References 

 
2015 NCAA Division I men's soccer season
2015